Naa Alludu is a 2005 Indian Telugu-language action comedy film directed by Vara Mullapudi from a story written by V. Vijayendra Prasad.  The film stars Jr. NTR, Ramya Krishna, Shriya, and Genelia while Suman, Rajiv Kanakala, Charan Raj, Brahmanandam, and Ali play supporting roles. The film was a Box-office bomb.

Plot
Karthik challenges a level-headed industrialist named Bhanumati that he would marry either of her daughters to take revenge on her for insulting him in his interview to get a job in her company. Meghana falls for Karthik just for the one accidental kiss he gives her. The younger one, Gagana, too follows suit, and now, Karthik has a grip over both of Bhanumati's daughters. Competing with him is Bhanumati's nephew Rahul, whose father Jayaraj too encourages him to chase his cousins and marry either of them to inherit their property. It is revealed in the flashback that Bhanumati leaves her husband Venkayya Naidu and that Karthik(Surya) is her nephew. How the responsible son-in-law sets his mother-in-law right and eliminates the villains from the game is what the story is about.

Cast 

 NTR Jr. as Karthik (Suryam) alias Thenga Vandi Murugan 
 Ramya Krishna as Bhanumathi Devi
 Shriya as Meghana, Bhanumati's daughter
 Genelia as Gagana, Bhanumati's daughter
 Rajiv Kanakala as Rahul
 Charan Raj as Jayaraj
 Brahmanandam as Ambarpet Pothuraju
 Ali as Saravanan, Karthik's friend
 Suman as Venkayya Naidu, Bhanumathi's husband
 Nassar as Sripathi
 Sudha as Sripathi's wife
 Kota Srinivasa Rao as Bilahari
 Teja Sajja As Suryam/Chandram
 Krishna Bhagawan as Alahari
 Hema
 Suman Setty
 Rallapalli

Soundtrack
The music was composed by Devi Sri Prasad and released by Aditya Music.

Dubbed versions
The film was dubbed into Tamil as Madurai Mappilai. The film was also dubbed and released in Hindi twice as Main Hoon Gambler in 2008 and in 2021.

References

External links

2000s Telugu-language films
2005 films
Films shot in New Zealand
2000s masala films